Todd Michael Muller (born 23 December 1968) is a New Zealand politician who served as the Leader of the New Zealand National Party and the Leader of the Opposition from 22 May to 14 July 2020.

Muller entered Parliament at the 2014 general election. He was elected as the MP for the Bay of Plenty electorate and has remained its MP since. For his first three years in Parliament, National was in government, and Muller served as the chairperson of the Foreign Affairs, Defence and Trade Select Committee.

He became the leader of the National Party in May 2020 after successfully challenging then-leader Simon Bridges. However, his mental health suffered, including suffering panic attacks, and he resigned the leadership after 53 days.

Muller announced in March 2023 that he would not seek a seat in parliament at the 2023 general election.

Early life 
Muller was born in Te Aroha on 23 December 1968, and was raised in Te Puna, where his parents started a kiwifruit orchard. He attended St Josephs, Te Puna primary school and Tauranga Boys' College.

He studied English, history and politics at the University of Waikato and graduated with a master's degree.

Career before politics 
Muller joined the New Zealand National Party in 1989. From 1994 to 1997 he served as Executive Assistant to Jim Bolger during his second term as Prime Minister.

Muller started his corporate career working for kiwifruit company Zespri as Industry Relations Manager from 2001 to 2003. He lists his CV as including the role of GM Corporate and Grower Services from 2003 to 2006, followed by a move to the position of CEO at Apata Ltd in January 2006. Apata, a Bay of Plenty company specialising in post-harvest operations, was founded by his father and others in 1983. From June 2011 to June 2014 he served as a director of Crown Research Institute, Plant and Food Research, the New Zealand-based science company providing research and development that adds value to fruit, vegetable, crop and food products. From August 2012 until June 2014, Muller served as a director of Sustainable Business Council NZ, a CEO-led group of companies that catalyses the New Zealand business community to have a leading role in creating a sustainable future for business, society and the environment. He served as a co-opted Waikato University councillor from October 2007 to June 2014.

Muller started work at dairy company Fonterra as Manager of Local Government and Regional Relations from February 2011 to May 2012. He then became Group Director of Co-operative Affairs from May 2012 until June 2014, when he left the company to campaign for the 2014 general election after being selected as the National Party candidate for the Bay of Plenty electorate.

Political career

Muller became a Member of Parliament in 2014. He was selected to replace Tony Ryall in 2014 as National's candidate in the Bay of Plenty electorate, and won by a margin of 15,096 votes. He retained the electorate in 2017, defeating Labour candidate Angie Warren-Clark by a margin of 13,996 votes.

While in Parliament Muller has served as the chairperson of the Foreign Affairs, Defence and Trade Select Committee, and as the deputy chairperson of the Education and Science Select Committee. As of February 2020 he was the Opposition spokesperson for agriculture, biosecurity, food safety, and forestry, and sat on the Primary Production Select Committee. He was ranked 16th in the shadow cabinet.

While in Opposition he was given the task of working with the Government on its Zero Carbon Bill. National ended up supporting the bill, with some caveats. Muller's work on the bill earned him respect from across the House.

In November 2019, Muller heckled Green MP Chlöe Swarbrick during her speech on climate change. Swarbrick quickly retorted "OK boomer". Although there was little reaction to her comment in Parliament, her two-word throwaway remark was covered in international news media.

In December 2019, Muller criticised a Te Papa display of bottles of water representing various water sources, with water dyed brown representing farm streams, describing it as "part of the museum's continued attacks on New Zealand's farmers".

2020 National leadership contest 

In May 2020, Muller challenged National Party leader Simon Bridges for the leadership on a joint ticket with Auckland Central MP Nikki Kaye. The reasons cited were poll results in a Newshub Reid Research Poll. The day prior to the challenge, he had publicly denied having leadership ambitions and supported Bridges despite a media endorsement from Jim Bolger. A One News Colmar Brunton poll released the evening before the coup had Muller on 0.2% preferred prime minister compared to Jacinda Ardern on 63%.

Muller won the resulting vote on 22 May 2020 with more than 29 votes cast for him. The party's caucus was said to be evenly divided over whether the leadership change was the correct course of action. Senior MP Anne Tolley was among those who spoke out in opposition to Muller's leadership challenge, calling it "nutty stuff", announcing that she would be retiring shortly thereafter. Another National MP, speaking to media on the condition of anonymity, described Muller in contrast to Bridges as a "pale stale male".

Leader of the Opposition (May–July 2020) 

Muller announced his shadow cabinet on 25 May, with senior caucus member Amy Adams announcing she was reversing her previous decision to retire. Muller stated former leader Simon Bridges was offered a shadow ministerial role but declined, saying he was taking time to consider his future. Bridges quickly stated he was taking "time out" and would stand and help win the next election. National MP Jo Hayes criticised Muller for the lack of ethnic diversity present in the new frontbench, telling media "This is not good. We need to remedy this or you [the party leadership] need to front it and take it head-on and say why. You need to give a better explanation." On the same day, Newshub reported that several National MPs were already leaking to media against Muller and his deputy Nikki Kaye, four days after the leadership change had occurred.

On 27 May, another leak against the leadership was made to Newshub claiming the campaign chair, Gerry Brownlee, had set up an "intelligence unit" to find negative information on political opponents. Brownlee said the leaks were "disappointing", untrue, and had come from "bitter backers" of former leader Simon Bridges. As a result of the leaks to media, inability to fend off criticism over his 'Make America Great Again' cap display (see below), and allegedly poor television interview performances, Muller was criticised by commentators traditionally supportive of the National Party including Mark Richardson. Fellow conservative commentator Mike Hosking opined in his New Zealand Herald column that "Todd Muller's first full day out including Parliament was little short of a disaster."

New Zealand First, who had been relentless critics of Bridges and who Bridges had ruled out as coalition partners in any future government, warmed to the new leader. MP Shane Jones said that "... I do sense coming from [him], good vibrations in contrast to Paula and Simon" 

However, Muller resigned on 14 July 2020, stating, "I am not the best person to be Leader of the Opposition and Leader of the New Zealand National Party at this critical time for New Zealand" and that the role had had a negative impact on his mental health. At just 53 days, Muller is the shortest-serving leader of any political party represented in Parliament in New Zealand's history. After being replaced as leader by Judith Collins, and taking sick leave for nearly four weeks, Muller stated in interviews, "I had anxiety. I had experienced that quite severely and I had panic attacks" that began on 27 May, five days after taking the leadership. He also ruled out another bid for the party leadership.

Post-leadership
In the 2020 New Zealand general election held in October, Muller retained his Bay of Plenty seat, defeating Labour candidate Angie Warren-Clark by a margin of 3,415 votes.

On 11 March 2021, Muller's Sunscreen (Product Safety Standard) Bill was pulled from the ballot. This Bill would allow consumers to seek redress under the Fair Trading Act 1986 if the sunscreen that they used was found to be weaker than its label. The bill passed its first reading on 7 April 2021. On 2 March 2022, the bill passed its third reading with unanimous cross-party support. As a result, sunscreen producers whose products fail to provide the protection they promised can be fined under the Fair Trading Act 1986. Muller stated that the new legislation would give New Zealand customers confidence in sunscreen products that they purchased. The Sunscreen Product Safety Standard Act 2022 received royal assent on 8 March 2022.

Retirement announcement, and reversal 
On 16 June 2021, Newsroom published an article on returning National MP Harete Hipango featuring negative comments from some MPs. At a late-night meeting on 22 June 2021, Muller admitted to the National caucus that he had been one of the MPs quoted, and apologised for the comments. He also admitted that for several years he had been providing inside information about the party to Richard Harman, the proprietor of the political news website Politik. According to the New Zealand Herald, Collins threatened to have the caucus vote to suspend him if he did not step down, while Chris Bishop urged him to leave with dignity "for the good of the party."

The next day, Muller announced that he would not stand for re-election at New Zealand's next general election. Muller declined to comment on any connection between his admission of speaking to Newsroom and his retirement, and cited health reasons for the resignation. He also took six weeks of leave after the announcement. Collins refused to say why Muller was resigning, or whether she felt Muller should leave Parliament before the next election. On 30 July 2021, Newsroom reported that Muller would not be returning to work at Parliament that week as scheduled, but would instead take a further three weeks of leave. A week later, 1 News reported that Muller would not attend National caucus meetings when he did return to Parliament.

On 21 August 2021, the Bay of Plenty Times published an interview with Muller where he made it clear that he still intends to return to Parliament when it next sits and to serve until the end of the term, despite speculation that he would leave earlier. In reflecting on his decisions over the previous 16 months, he said "I'm comfortable with what I've done with one exception – clearly my comments with respect to Harete [Hipango] were a mistake and I've apologised for that." Concerning the fallout from those comments, Muller said he bears Judith Collins "no ill will," while acknowledging that "the relationship between the two of us has broken down."

In December 2021, Christopher Luxon took over leadership of the National Party from Judith Collins. Subsequently, Muller announced that he had reversed his decision and would not retire.

Luxon's shadow cabinet
In December 2021, Muller became the National Party's spokesperson for oceans and fisheries and internal affairs. In October 2022, Muller also became its acting spokesperson for agriculture, biosecurity, and food safety after Barbara Kuriger resigned from those positions due to a personal conflict of interest. Following a reshuffle on January 2023, Muller was confirmed as National's agriculture spokesperson and also became the party's climate change spokesperson. He was promoted to 12th place in Luxon's shadow cabinet.

In March 2023, Muller announced he would in fact leave politics at the 2023 general election. His spokesperson roles were assigned to other National MPs.

Political views 
Muller takes a socially conservative position on issues such as abortion, euthanasia and drug liberalisation.

He has called for greater action on climate change, having worked with Ardern's government on the Zero Carbon Bill.

Muller is an admirer of American politics. He received attention in 2020 for his intention to display a 'Make America Great Again' cap in his Parliamentary office as part of a collection of American political memorabilia, with a Muslim community leader calling on him to leave it at home. Muller responded that he was "very comfortable" including it in his collection and that he hoped people would understand the context of the display. He later changed his mind and decided not to display it. After seeing both of them speak in person, Muller stated that he believed Biden was better at delivering speeches than Trump.

Personal life 
Muller and his wife Michelle have three children. Muller is a practising Catholic. Muller has had five skin cancers cut from his body, prompting his interest in legislation regulating the use of sunscreens in New Zealand.

References

External links

|-

|-

Living people
1968 births
People educated at Tauranga Boys' College
University of Waikato alumni
Fonterra people
New Zealand National Party MPs
Members of the New Zealand House of Representatives
New Zealand MPs for North Island electorates
21st-century New Zealand politicians
Candidates in the 2017 New Zealand general election
New Zealand National Party leaders
Leaders of the Opposition (New Zealand)
New Zealand Roman Catholics